Founded in 1976 by John Glines, Barry Laine and Jerry Tobin, The Glines is an American not-for-profit organization based in New York City, New York, devoted to creating and presenting gay art to develop positive self-images and dispel negative stereotyping.

Awards
In 1983, The Glines production of Harvey Fierstein's Torch Song Trilogy won Tony Awards for Best Play and Best Actor.
The Glines/Circle Repertory Company co-production of William M. Hoffman's As Is won the 1985 Drama Desk Award for Best Play and was Tony-nominated for Best Play, Best Director and Best Actor.
The Glines/PSX production of Howard Crabtree's Whoop-Dee-Doo! won the 1994 Drama Desk Award for Best Musical Revue and Best Costume Design.

Productions

Other notable successes produced by The Glines include:

 Jane Chambers’s Last Summer at Bluefish Cove, My Blue Heaven and The Quintessential Image
Doric Wilson’s A Perfect Relationship and Forever After
Victor Bumbalo’s Niagara Falls
Richard Hall’s Love Match
Sydney Morris’s If This Isn’t Love! and The Wind Beneath My Wings
Arch Brown’s Newsboy and Sex Symbols
Joseph Pintauro’s Wild Blue
Anthony Bruno’s Soul Survivor
Robert Patrick’s T-Shirts and Untold Decades
Tom Wilson Weinberg’s musical Get Used to It!
An Evening With Quentin Crisp
a number of plays by John Glines, including On Tina Tuna Walk, Men Of Manhattan, Body And Soul and Murder In Disguise
plus the First and Second Gay American Arts Festivals in 1980 and 1981.

A benefit in 1982 was given by The Glines was at The Town Hall, a performance space in New York City, consisting of three one-act plays: The Quintessential Image by Jane Chambers (with Peg Murray in the title role), Forget Him by Harvey Fierstein (with Harvey Fierstein, Estelle Getty and Court Miller), and A Loss of Memory by Arthur Laurents (with Richard DeFabees, who played Arnold in matinée performances of Torch Song Trilogy).

The Glines broke into television in 1986 with its acclaimed production of Hero of My Own Life, a documentary on the life of a person living with AIDS.

Artists

Among the many artists who have appeared (or whose work has appeared) with The Glines are: 

Caroline Aaron
Pat Bond
Matthew Broderick
Charles Busch
Thomas Calabro
Andrea Dworkin
Harvey Fierstein
Estelle Getty
Allen Ginsberg
Judy Grahn

Jonathan Hadary
Lou Liberatore
Audre Lorde
Dan Lauria
Armistead Maupin
Mark Morris
Park Overall
Felice Picano
James Purdy
John Rechy

Ned Rorem
Mercedes Ruehl
Vito Russo
Richard Skipper
Jean Smart
Fisher Stevens
Robin Tyler
Edmund White
Jack Wrangler

References

External links 
 the Glines website
 John Glines papers, 1971-1998, held by the Billy Rose Theatre Division, New York Public Library for the Performing Arts
 Fascination Michael’s Thing, 1975
 Dancing for Our Lives Jennifer Dunning, The New York Times, January 12, 1986.
 Good Sense and Dancing on Ice James A. Lobata,  oobr, Summer 1988.
 Thor’s Day Edward Crosby Wells (author) website
 Meet Marvin D.J.R. Bruckner, The New York Times, April 29, 1993
 TOSOS and The Glines, glbtq, a web-based "encyclopedia of gay, lesbian, bisexual, transgender & queer culture"
 Info and pics on Gulp! One actor’s experience, Queer Music Heritage website, compiled by JD Doyle
 The Glines Records (MS 1920). Manuscripts and Archives, Yale University Library.
 John Glines Papers (MS 1895). Manuscripts and Archives, Yale University Library.

Non-profit organizations based in New York City
Organizations established in 1976
LGBT organizations in the United States
Theatre in New York City